Bywell is a village and civil parish in Northumberland, England. It is situated on the north bank of the River Tyne opposite Stocksfield, between Hexham and Newcastle. The parish has a population of around 380 and Newton is now its most populous settlement.

Name
Bywell means bend in the river. Bywell is situated on a bend on the River Tyne. That is how the village got its name.

Governance
Bywell is in the parliamentary constituency of Hexham.

An electoral ward of the same name exists. This ward stretches east to Wylam with a total population of 4,534.

Landmarks 

Bywell Hall is an imposing house of 1766 by James Paine.

Bywell Castle is a gatehouse tower built in the early 15th century for Ralph Neville, Earl of Westmorland.

There are two churches in Bywell.

Part of a cross is another reminder of the early period, when the church then had narrow nave, chancel and apse. It was very much enlarged in the thirteenth century in a time of local prosperity. In the nineteenth century it was extensively restored, and a lot of medieval grave covers were built into the walls of the church very attractively. The thirteenth-century font was where Robert Surtees, the sporting novelist was baptized. He was born at the Riding on 26 August 1806. There are monuments to Fenwicks of Bywell and Bacons of Styford. St Andrew's Church is now surplus to requirements and is preserved as part of our heritage. The vicarage was demolished in 1852, and Mr Beaumont gave land for building another at Riding Mill.

 St Peter's Church is different in situation, among the trees and close to the river. It has a square medieval tower, and the church was extended in the thirteenth century. A close examination of the stonework will reveal features of the Saxon period, and there is evidence of more extensive buildings. There is a tide dial on the south wall. The north chantry or chapel was for many years used as a school. One lancet window is a memorial to the curate Henry Parr Dwarris, who was drowned in the Tyne. There is a monumental brass to Wentworth Canning Blackett Beaumont, Viscount Allendale, born at Bywell Hall in 1860. He presented the Sele and Priory grounds to the people of Hexham. Another inscription commemorates William Wailes (1881), artist in stained glass. The church is also partly 8th century in date and it is possibly the building in which Bishop Egbert of Lindisfarne was consecrated in AD 802.

The high garden wall to the south-west of the old vicarage is known locally as the "spite wall". It was built to hide the vicarage from the view of the Hall. When the village of Bywell was cleared, the vicar could not be made to leave.

Land Owners
Lord and Lady Allendale own much of the land surrounding Bywell. They also own a good chunk of Bywell itself. A substantial amount of Bywell is not open to the public.

Transport

Rail

The village is served by Stocksfield railway station on the Tyne Valley Line. The line was fully opened in 1838, and links the city of Newcastle upon Tyne with Carlisle in Cumbria. The line follows the course of the River Tyne through Northumberland.

Passenger services on the Tyne Valley Line are operated by Northern. The line is also used for freight.

Road
Bywell is in close proximity to the A69 dual carriage-way, although you have to go up a B road to get to the A69.

Education

Bywell is in the catchment area for Ovingham First School, despite Broomley First school in Stocksfield being closer. Bywell is in the catchment area for Ovingham Middle School and Prudhoe Community High School. Mowden Hall School is a private preparatory school in Newton Hall, in the north of Bywell Parish.

Events
Each year in May, Lord and Lady Allendale hold a hunter trial course in aid of the Charlotte Straker Project.

Since 2013 the Northumberland County Show has been held around in the grounds of Bywell Hall.

Notable people 
 Wentworth Canning Blackett Beaumont, Viscount Allendale (1860-1923) was born at Bywell Hall

See also 
 Bywell Bridge

References

External links

 Allendale Estates
GENUKI (Accessed: 12 November 2008)

 
Villages in Northumberland
Civil parishes in Northumberland